The Kyle Building (also known as Kyle Block) was built in 1933 in downtown Beaumont, Texas. It was designed as a retail storefront, with two-story offices at each end of the building. It is located at 215 Orleans St.  The building contains 11 stores, and it is an excellent example of Zig-Zag Art Deco architecture. A contributing property to the Beaumont Historic District, it is located at the site of the former Kyle Opera house, which was demolished in 1931.

Photo gallery

See also

National Register of Historic Places listings in Jefferson County, Texas

References

External links

Buildings and structures in Beaumont, Texas
Art Deco architecture in Texas
Historic district contributing properties in Texas
Commercial buildings completed in 1933
National Register of Historic Places in Jefferson County, Texas